Ponyboy can refer to:

 Ponyboy Curtis, a character in the novel The Outsiders by S. E. Hinton, Hard Cover
 My Pony Boy, a song from 1909
 "Ponyboy", a 2017 song by Sophie from Oil of Every Pearl's Un-Insides
 Ponyplay, a human sexual roleplay, see Human animal roleplay